Gastrosporium is the sole genus in the fungal family Gastrosporiaceae. It contains two truffle-like species, the type G. simplex, and G. asiaticum. Both the family and genus were circumscribed by Italian mycologist Oreste Mattirolo in 1903.

References

Phallales